Luzia is a studio album by Paco de Lucía. It was made as a dedication to his Portuguese mother (hence the Portuguese spelling) when she died.

Track listing
"Río de la miel" (Bulerías) – 5:08
"La Villa vieja" (Soleares) – 6:52
"Calle Munición” (Alegrías) – 5:37
"Me regalé" (Tangos) – 5:36
"Luzia" (Siguiriya) – 5:40
"Manteca colorá" (Rumba) – 4:58
"El chorruelo" (Bulerías) – 5:58
"Camarón" (Rondeñas) – 6:07

Musicians
Paco de Lucía - Flamenco guitar, vocals
Tino Di Geraldo - Tabla, Percussion
Carles Benavent - Bajo (Bass), Mandola
Duquende - Vocals      
Josemi Carmona - Mandola
 Luis Dulzaides - Congas

References

 Gamboa, Manuel José and Nuñez, Faustino. (2003). Paco de Lucía. Madrid:Universal Music Spain.

1998 albums
Paco de Lucía albums